An airsmith is an airflow technician who engineers, designs, builds, and repairs high pressure air pumps and compressors for practical use.

Which is only becoming more and more of an essential part of the workforce. Because as Rep. Mark Wayne Mullin (R-OKLA.) reported to The Hill, “HVAC systems, and the contractors who install them, are vital to the economy and our livelihoods. They ensure a fresh food supply and that data centers are operational. They also provide essential comfort and indoor air quality for every home, health care facility, and office building.”
 
    
Equipment used or dealt with can include:   
SCBA (self contained breathing apparatus)    
Pneumatic jackhammers
High pressure tanks.   
    
An air conditioning & heating technician would be an example of an airsmith.

References

Gas compressors
Heating, ventilation, and air conditioning
Industrial breathing sets
Pumps